WMOV-FM (107.7 MHz) is a commercial radio station in Norfolk, Virginia, serving Hampton Roads.  It is owned and operated by iHeartMedia, Inc. The station carries a rhythmic adult contemporary radio format.  For much of November and December, it switches to Christmas music.  The radio studios and offices are on Norfolk Square.

The transmitter is located on Poindexter Street in Chesapeake, near the Elizabeth River and Interstate 464. WMOV-FM broadcasts using HD Radio technology.  Its HD-2 digital subchannel formerly ran the soft rock format of the iHeartRadio Cafe.  The HD-3 subchannel formerly carried iHeart's soft adult contemporary music service "The Breeze."

History

WXRI-FM
In April 1990, the station signed on as WXRI-FM.  It was owned by J.H. Communications, taking the call sign of the former station on the 105.3 frequency that had been owned by televangelist Pat Robertson until its sale in May 1989. It initially broadcast a business format from the Business Radio Network.

The station stunted with Christmas music and then relaunched on Christmas Day with the Contemporary Christian music format of the previous WXRI. That ended when its parent company entered into an agreement in May 1992 to simulcast the music of WBSK, an urban contemporary station that was co-owned with WOWI.

WSVY
In May 1993, WBSK-FM changed its call sign to WSVY, and shifted to an Urban Adult Contemporary format.

In July 1997, WSVY began simulcasting with 92.1 FM as "Vibe 107.7 and 92.1."

By March 1999, WSVY shifted to the then-popular Jammin' Oldies format, which evolved back to Urban AC. On June 25, 2001, WSVY and sister WJCD swapped formats and call letters, with the Urban AC "Vibe" format moving to 105.3 FM, while WJCD's Smooth Jazz format moved to 107.7.

WJCD
On March 1, 2004, WJCD flipped to adult contemporary as "Lite FM", and resumed its simulcast with 92.1, which dropped its urban format. 92.1 would drop out of the simulcast again on August 12, 2005, when it flipped to oldies as WCDG.

On December 26, 2006, WJCD flipped back to smooth jazz as "Smooth Jazz 107.7."

WKUS
On October 11, 2010, WJCD and WCDG became simulcasts again when WKUS moved from 105.3 to 107.7 and the 105.3 frequency became "Magic 105.3" with an AC-themed Classic Hits format. The move meant the end for WJCD's smooth jazz format and WCDG's Oldies format. On October 27, 2010, WJCD changed their call letters to WKUS.

On March 31, 2011, at 3 p.m., WKUS broke away from its simulcast of WKSA and flipped to Rhythmic AC, branded as "MOViN' 107.7". The first song on "MOViN'" was "Get Ready for This" by 2 Unlimited.

WMOV-FM
On April 7, 2011, WKUS changed its call letters to WMOV-FM to match the new format.  (The FM suffix is required because there is a WMOV on the AM dial in Ravenswood, West Virginia, with a different owner.)

On November 2, 2012, WMOV-FM began to stunt with Christmas music as "Christmas 107.7", suggesting a possible format change. This did not occur, and it returned to its regular format on December 26. It has continued switching to Christmas music every Mid-November to late December, ever since.

As of October 2018, WMOV-FM began patterning itself after sister station WKTU New York City with an emphasis on Rhythmic Pop/Dance music.

The station now competes as of 2022 with WVBW which flipped to Rhythmic AC.

HD Radio
On WMOV-FM's HD Radio digital subchannel, its HD2 service originates "The iHeartRadio Café", a format consisting of 70s–80s Soft Rock and "Yacht rock" music, much of it from singer-songwriters such as Billy Joel, Carly Simon, James Taylor and Carole King.  It is heard nationally through the iHeartRadio app.

The HD3 subchannel carries iHeart's "The Breeze" soft adult contemporary music service.

References

External links
Movin' 107.7 Online

MOV-FM
Rhythmic adult contemporary radio stations
IHeartMedia radio stations
Radio stations established in 1990